Van R. Johnson (born 1968) is an American politician who currently serves as the 67th Mayor of Savannah, Georgia. He is the fourth African-American mayor in the city's history. Having previously served four terms as alderman for Savannah's First District, Johnson unseated Eddie DeLoach in the 2019 Savannah mayoral election and was sworn in as mayor of Savannah on January 1, 2020.

Early life and education
Born in Brooklyn, Johnson graduated from high school at age 16 and enrolled in Savannah State University, the oldest public historically Black college and university in the state of Georgia. He earned a bachelor's degree in business administration in 1990 and a master's degree in public administration from Georgia Southern University.

Career
After college, Johnson worked as an assistant director of human resources for Savannah's Chatham County and later as a police officer. From 2004 to 2020, he served as alderman for the Savannah City Council’s 1st District, additionally serving as Mayor Pro Tem and vice chair during his tenure. Johnson unseated incumbent Eddie DeLoach in the 2019 Savannah mayoral election and was sworn in as mayor on January 1, 2020.

References

Living people
21st-century American politicians
Savannah State University alumni
Georgia Southern University alumni
Georgia (U.S. state) Democrats
Mayors of Savannah, Georgia
African-American mayors in Georgia (U.S. state)
2020 United States presidential electors
21st-century African-American politicians
1968 births